Gisa Mukhadovich Pshukov (born 19 August 1971) is a former Russian football player.

References

1971 births
Living people
Soviet footballers
FC Dynamo Moscow reserves players
Russian footballers
FC Chernomorets Novorossiysk players
Russian Premier League players
Association football goalkeepers
FC Iskra Smolensk players